Darwinia pinifolia is a species of flowering plant in the family Myrtaceae and is endemic to the southwest of Western Australia. It is a low, spreading to prostrate shrub with linear leaves and dense heads of erect, red to purple flowers.

Description
The flowers are erect, red to purple, arranged in dense heads on the ends of branches, surrounded by egg-shaped or spatula-shaped bracteoles that are shorter than the flowers. Flowering occurs from September to February.

Taxonomy
This species was first formally described in 1839 by John Lindley who gave it the name Hedaroma pinifolium in A Sketch of the Vegetation of the Swan River Colony. In 1865, George Bentham changed the name to Pimelea pinifolia in Journal of the Linnean Society, Botany. The specific epithet (pinifolia) means "pine-leaved".

Distribution and habitat
Darwinia pinifolia is typically found in sandy soils in winter-wet areas in the Geraldton Sandplains, Jarrah Forest and Swan Coastal Plain bioregions of south-western Western Australia.

References

pinifolia
Endemic flora of Western Australia
Myrtales of Australia
Rosids of Western Australia
Plants described in 1839
Taxa named by John Lindley